The 2021–22 season is Swansea City's 110th season in existence and their fourth consecutive season in the second tier of English football, the Championship. Alongside the Championship, they will also compete in the FA Cup and the EFL Cup. The season covers the period from 1 June 2021 to 31 May 2022.

Pre-season

Managerial change
Head coach Steve Cooper left the club by mutual consent during pre-season, on 21 July 2021. He was replaced by Russell Martin on 1 August, six days before Swansea's first game of the season.

Friendlies
The Swans announced they would have friendlies against Swindon Town, Plymouth Argyle, Bristol Rovers, and Forest Green Rovers and Southampton as part of the club's pre-season preparations. However, the friendly against Swindon was cancelled due to "ongoing logistical and operational issues" at Swindon. The friendly against Bristol Rovers was also cancelled due to positive Coronavirus cases within Swansea's first-team bubble.

Club

Club officials

First-team staff

First-team squad

Competitions

Championship

League table

Results summary

Results by matchday

Matches
Swansea City's fixtures were revealed on 24 June 2021.

FA Cup

The Swans were drawn at home to Southampton in the third round.

EFL Cup

Swansea City were drawn away to Reading in the first round, At home to Plymouth Argyle in the second round and away to Brighton & Hove Albion in the third round.

Statistics

Players with names in italics and marked * were on loan from another club for the whole of their season with Swansea City.

 

|-
!colspan=15|Players who left the club:

|}

Transfers

Transfers in

Loans in

Loans out

Transfers out

References

Notes

Swansea City
Swansea City A.F.C. seasons
Welsh football clubs 2021–22 season